Joseph Henry Tobin Jr. (born August 7, 1942), known professionally as Tobin Bell, is an American actor and producer. He has appeared in a number of television shows and films, but is most recognized for his role as John Kramer / Jigsaw in the  Saw franchise.

He started his acting career in the late 1970s and early 1980s doing stand-ins and background work on feature films. He had his first feature film role in Mississippi Burning (1988). Throughout the 1990s and 2000s, Bell appeared in a number of films and television shows, including The Firm (1993), Unabomber: The True Story (1996), Walker, Texas Ranger (1998) and early seasons of The Sopranos (2001) and 24 (2003). 

His breakout role came in 2004 when he was cast as the serial killer Jigsaw in Saw (2004).  The film was a box office success and Bell went on to portray the character in nine out of the ten sequels: Saw II (2005), Saw III (2006), Saw IV (2007), Saw V (2008), Saw VI (2009), Saw 3D (2010), Jigsaw (2017)  and the upcoming Saw X (2023). The series was not a critical success, but financially it became one of the highest-grossing horror franchises of all time and earned Bell recognition as a horror icon.

Early life and education
Joseph Henry Tobin Jr. was born on August 7, 1942 in Queens, New York and raised in Weymouth, Massachusetts. His English mother, Eileen Julia Bell Tobin, was an actress who worked at the Quincy Repertory Company. His American father, Joseph H. Tobin, built and established the radio station WJDA in Quincy, Massachusetts, in 1947 and once ran for mayor of Gloversville, New York. He has one sister and one brother. 

Bell studied liberal arts and journalism in college, with the intention of becoming a writer and entering the broadcasting field. He also has an interest in environmental matters, holding a master's degree in environmental science from Montclair State University as well as having worked for the New York Botanical Garden. He credits hearing a seminar by Hume Cronyn and Jessica Tandy at Boston University with inspiring him to begin an acting career. Bell later joined the Actors Studio where he studied with Lee Strasberg and Ellen Burstyn, and joined Sanford Meisner's Neighborhood Playhouse.

Career

1979–2003: Work in background roles, film debut and television appearances 

Bell played background roles in the late 1970s and early 1980s in over 30 films, including Woody Allen's Manhattan (1979), while also performing on off-Broadway and off-off-Broadway. Bell said that other actors at the Actors Studio thought doing stand-in and background work was "stupid or degrading", but he believed otherwise. In 1982, he had an uncredited scene in the Sydney Pollack film, Tootsie, playing a waiter at the Russian Tea Room that Pollack used as a tracking shot. He told Movieline, "You know, when you're talking about Tootsie, it's the tip of the iceberg, because those other twenty-nine films I did aren't even on IMDb." 

He worked on The Verdict (1982) for two weeks as a courtroom reporter in the trial. He recollected it being a "great opportunity" watching Sidney Lumet and Paul Newman, while also learning the technical aspect of acting. For every role he plays, starting with the initial reading of the script to the final shot of a production, he keeps a journal of various questions about and motivations for his character. "I write all kinds of stream-of-consciousness things that help me." He would have his first speaking role in the 1983 film Svengali playing a waiter with three lines.  The same year Bell had a small speaking role as a reporter in the drama Sophie's Choice. In the mid-1980s, Bell said "I was doing off-Broadway plays three nights a week, working on my craft. And a director at the Actors Studio said, 'You know, Tobin you've been doing that for a while. I think you should go to Hollywood and play bad guys'." Bell moved to Los Angeles and was cast in his first feature film, Mississippi Burning in 1988, as "tough and street smart" FBI Agent Stokes. 

In 1993, Bell was cast in another Pollack film, The Firm as an assassin called "The Nordic Man". The same year, he played Mendoza in In the Line of Fire, where he attempts to taunt an undercover Clint Eastwood into proving his loyalty by murdering his partner, played by Dylan McDermott. He went on to appear in an episode of the sitcom Seinfeld titled "The Old Man" playing a record store owner. He appeared in two episodes of NYPD Blue playing different characters in 1993 and 1996. In 1994, Bell played a hospital administrator in the second episode of the first season of ER and went on to appear in an episode of another medical drama Chicago Hope, playing a terminally ill inmate on death row. That same year, he portrayed Ted Kaczynski in the made-for-television film Unabomber: The True Story. In 1997, Bell guest starred in an episode of La Femme Nikita and Nash Bridges. The following year, he guest starred in an episode of Stargate SG-1 and a two-part episode of Walker, Texas Ranger. Bell made a one-scene appearance in the 2001 episode Army of One of The Sopranos playing Major Carl Zwingli. In 2003, he was cast as the villain Peter Kingsley during the second season of 24.

2004–2010: Saw breakthrough role and becoming a horror icon 
Bell's breakthrough role came in 2003 when he was cast as John Kramer / Jigsaw in the horror film, Saw. The film is about John Kramer who is an engineer-turned-serial killer that wants others to appreciate the value of life by placing them in twisted "games" of physical and psychological torture.  The film was James Wan's directorial debut and was shot in 18 days on a budget of $1.2 million.  Bell spent two weeks lying on a floor and had very few lines, but his role was pivotal to the film.  He credits two reasons he joined the film; the opportunity to work with Danny Glover for the first time and thought very highly of the film's ending. Lionsgate acquired the worldwide distribution rights for the film days before its release at the 2004 Sundance Film Festival.  While initially getting a direct-to-video release, test screenings that March turned out positive prompting Lionsgate to release it theatrically that Halloween.  It became a box office success, grossing $103 million worldwide and receiving mixed reviews from critics. Even though Bell would join the first film with no intention of a second film being made, as a result of the financial success, six direct sequels were released on every October from 2005 to 2010.

The following year, Bell starred in Saw II, which he said was because "the character of John Kramer was not fully define and he had an opportunity as an actor to take him to the next level". In 2006's Saw III his character was killed off, however he later signed on for up to five sequels.  He would return to Saw IV, Saw V, Saw VI and Saw 3D where Jigsaw is featured in flashbacks, some focusing on his origin. He explained, "Saw doesn't happen in a straight line so, you know, in Hollywood everything's possible. It just depends on if you can do it well you can do it. There's a certain thing that we've done in Saw where it's like pieces of a puzzle. It happens out of sync. So that's how it's done."  He provided his voice and likeness for the Jigsaw character in the 2009 Saw video game and its 2010 sequel, Saw II: Flesh & Blood. 

For his role as Jigsaw, Bell received MTV Movie Awards nominations in 2006 and 2007 for "Best Villain". He won "Best Butcher" in the Fuse/Fangoria Chainsaw Awards and was given the "Best Villain in a Film Series" title at the 2010 Chiller-Eyegore Awards.  The Saw franchise went on to become one of the highest-grossing horror franchises of all time making, as of 2021, over $1 billion worldwide. The character Jigsaw has been labeled a horror icon.

2014–present: Later work and return to the Saw franchise
In March 2014, Bell played the antagonist Seth in Victor Salva's horror film Dark House. It received generally negative reviews.   The following month he was featured in an episode of Criminal Minds, playing a farmer from West Virginia.  In the comedy Manson Family Vacation Bell plays a guy who is one of Charlie Manson's followers and lives on his old property in Death Valley. It premiered at South by Southwest in March 2015 to positive reviews with Variety pointing out Bell's "creepy gravitas" take on the role. 

In March 2016, Bell joined the soap opera Days of Our Lives for a five-episode arch playing Yo Ling, who is revealed to be John Black's long lost father. From 2016 and 2017, he guest starred as the voices of the villain Doctor Alchemy and the malicious speed god and main antagonist Savitar on the third season of The Flash, in which he was uncredited throughout the season until his last episode.  Bell was cast in April 2017 in a short film, My Pretty Pony based on Stephen King's short story My Pretty Pony. In October 2017, seven years after Saw 3D  was released and marketed as the final Saw film, Bell reprises his role as Jigsaw in the standalone film Jigsaw. It received generally unfavorable reviews from critics and grossed a total of $103 million worldwide.<ref>{{Cite web|title='Jigsaw - Movie Reviews Top Critics|url=https://www.rottentomatoes.com/m/jigsaw_2017/reviews|website=Rotten Tomatoes|access-date=2023-02-13|archive-date=February 13, 2023|archive-url=https://web.archive.org/web/20230213200552/https://www.rottentomatoes.com/m/jigsaw_2017/reviews|url-status=live}}</ref>  Bell was also featured in other horror films released in October 2017, including the television film The Sandman, the Mexican film Belzebuth and Italian film Gates of Darkness.  

Bell guest starred in a September 2019 episode of Creepshow, alongside Giancarlo Esposito in the segment "Gray Matter" that is based on King's short story of the same name. In May 2021, he played Dr. Lasher in an eight-part found footage fictional podcast series, The Gloom. The series is about a string of unsolved crimes committed by a group of teens in the 1990s while an investigative journalist uncovers a supernatural cover-up that is tied to her past.  In March 2023, he played Von in the indie psychological thriller ReBroken.  Bell will play Jigsaw once again in the tentatively titled, Saw X'', scheduled for release in October 2023.

Personal life
Bell coaches a Little League Baseball team and flag football. His other hobbies include hiking and playing guitar. He is a member of the Academy of Motion Picture Arts and Sciences.

Credits

Film

Television

Video games

Podcasts

Further reading

References

External links

 
 
 

1942 births
Living people
American male film actors
American male television actors
American people of English descent
Male actors from Massachusetts
Montclair State University alumni
People from Queens, New York
People from Weymouth, Massachusetts
20th-century American male actors
21st-century American male actors